The 2005 Speedway Grand Prix Qualification or GP Challenge was a series of motorcycle speedway meetings used to determine the 2 riders that would qualify for the 2005 Speedway Grand Prix to join the other 8 riders that finished in the leading positions from the 2004 Speedway Grand Prix and 6 seeded riders.

The system introduced the previous year, that of four quarter finals and two semi-finals was retained but due to the main Grand Prix being reduced from 24 riders to 16 only 2 riders would qualify through the GP Challenge.

Antonio Lindbäck won the GP Challenge.

Format
 First Round (64 riders qualifying from respective national championships)
 Quarter finals – 32 riders to semi-finals
 Semi-finals – 16 riders to GP Challenge
 Final Round – 2 riders from the GP Challenge to the 2005 Grand Prix

Quarter-finals
32 riders to semi-finals

Semi-finals
16 riders from to GP Challenge

Final Round
Hans Andersen was extremely unlucky not to seal a place in the Grand Prix after topping the event with 14 points and then suffering an engine failure in the final.

GP Challenge
2 riders to 2005 Grand Prix
14 August 2004  Vojens

References 

Speedway Grand Prix Qualification
Speedway Grand Prix Qualifications